Iraq participated at the 2018 Summer Youth Olympics in Buenos Aires, Argentina from 6 October to 18 October 2018.

Athletics

Equestrian

Iraq was given a rider to compete from the tripartite committee.

 Individual Jumping - 1 athlete

Summary

Futsal

Boys' tournament

Roster
Layth Noori
Mohammed Ismael
Abbas Abdulkareem
Salim Kadhim
Mohammed Faeq
Hussein Sabri
Ezzat Sabeeh
Qusay Muntadher
Hadi Alaa
Hussein Abdulrahman

Group stage

Fencing

Iraq was given a quota to compete by the tripartite committee.

 Boys' Sabre - 1 quota

Shooting

Iraq was given a quota by the tripartite committee to compete in shooting.

 Girls' 10m Air Pistol - 1 quota

Individual

Team

References

2018 in Iraqi sport
Nations at the 2018 Summer Youth Olympics
Iraq at the Youth Olympics